The Cadí-Moixeró Natural Park is a natural park to the north of Catalonia, Spain, near the border with Andorra. The park was established in 1983 and encompasses  of mountainous terrain in the comarques of Alt Urgell, Berguedà and Cerdanya.

References

External links
 

Natural parks of Catalonia
Protected areas of the Pyrenees
Pyrenees conifer and mixed forests